{{Infobox television
| image                = Nestlogo.jpg
| genre                = Sitcom
| creator              = Susan Harris<ref>{{cite news|title= Golden Girls' Creator Adds Shows |newspaper= LA Times|date=September 10, 1991|url= http://articles.latimes.com/1991-09-10/entertainment/ca-2286_1_golden-girls|access-date=2010-08-24}}</ref>
| writer               = 
| director             = 
| starring             = 
| theme_music_composer = 
| opentheme            = "Life Goes On" performed by Billy Vera
| endtheme             = 
| composer             = 
| country              = United States
| language             = English
| num_seasons          = 7
| num_episodes         = 170
| list_episodes        = List of Empty Nest episodes
| executive_producer   = 
| producer             = 
| camera               = Multi-camera
| runtime              = 22–24 minutes
| company              = 
| distributor          = 
| network              = NBC
| picture_format       = 
| audio_format         = 
| first_aired          = 
| last_aired           = 
| related              = 
}}Empty Nest is an American television sitcom that aired for seven seasons on NBC from October 8, 1988, to April 29, 1995. The series, which was created as a spin-off of The Golden Girls by creator and producer Susan Harris, starred Richard Mulligan as recently widowed pediatrician Dr. Harry Weston, whose two adult daughters return home to live with him.

Produced by Witt/Thomas/Harris Productions in association with Touchstone Television.

History
An early version of the series initially appeared in the 1987 Golden Girls episode "Empty Nests" which was intended to act as a backdoor pilot for the spin-off, which was to begin during the fall 1987 TV season.

In the episode, George and Renee Corliss (played by Paul Dooley and Rita Moreno), were introduced as the Girls' neighbors, a middle-aged couple suffering from empty nest syndrome. Their teenage daughter Jenny (Jane Harnick), who had left for college, and Renee's brother Chuck (Geoffrey Lewis), also appeared. The Corlisses also had an annoying neighbor played by David Leisure (although in this version his character was named Oliver).

Rita Moreno later criticized the Empty Nest pilot, calling it a "very, very bad show." She explained that the script desperately needed rewrites from creator Susan Harris, but she was very sick the week of shooting so it was left to other writers to fix. According to Moreno, "every day they kept changing my character, to the extent that by the time we got to do it in front of an audience I couldn't remember Line 1 because the attitudes had changed so many times. That was the most embarrassing experience...we must have done, I would guess, about 15 takes in front of an audience."

Ultimately, the series did not go ahead as planned and the premise was later extensively revamped with a new cast before Empty Nest debuted in 1988. The set of the Corlisses' house, however, was exactly the same as the one that later became the Weston residence.

 Premise 
The show's story revolves around middle-aged Miami pediatrician Dr. Harry Weston (Richard Mulligan), whose life is turned upside down when his wife, Libby (Judith-Marie Bergan), dies and two of his adult daughters move back into the family home. Early episodes establish that the Golden Girls characters are neighbors of the Westons. Original Golden Girls actors, Bea Arthur, Rue McClanahan, Betty White and Estelle Getty all guest-star as their Golden Girls characters, and Mulligan appear occasionally on The Golden Girls.

In the show, eldest daughter Carol (Dinah Manoff) is a neurotic, high-strung recent divorcée, while middle daughter Barbara (Kristy McNichol) is a tough undercover police officer. The two sisters frequently bicker and vie for the attention of their father, whom they call "Daddy", while their father occasionally expresses regret at never having had a son. The Westons' large dog Dreyfuss also prominently features as a member of the household.

In 1992, Kristy McNichol, who played Barbara, left the show and Lisa Rieffel joined the cast to play a third, youngest Weston daughter, Emily. Her character had previously not been shown onscreen but had been mentioned as being away at college. Rieffel left after one season, and for the show's final two seasons only eldest daughter, Carol remained of the Weston children. Kristy McNichol returned for the series finale in 1995.

Another main character is the Westons' neighbor and best friend, Charley Dietz (David Leisure), a womanizing cruise ship employee who frequently barges into the house unannounced to borrow food or make sexist comments. Charley has a father-son relationship with Harry and a love-hate relationship with Carol.

Harry Weston's job is another major focus for the show. For the first five seasons he works at a hospital, where he is assisted by wisecracking Southern nurse Laverne (Park Overall). Laverne and Harry are shown to be good friends, originating with their first on-screen meeting in a sandwich shop where they start an argument over who would get the last Samms Sammich. Shown to consist of turkey, roast beef, salami, pepperoni, ham, grilled chicken, a veggie patty, tuna, meatballs and fake crab meat, this combination became the number one selling sandwich in Tacoma after the airing of this episode. In season six Harry retires, eventually going to work for a struggling inner-city medical clinic run by the tough-talking Dr. Maxine Douglas (Marsha Warfield). Nurse Laverne, having been fired by Dr. Weston's replacement, comes to work there as well.

Another character who make an appearance is Carol's boyfriend, Patrick (Paul Provenza), an artist who is almost as eccentric as she is. Patrick convinces the Westons to let him use their empty garage as his new painting studio and, when his relationship with Carol becomes serious, he eventually moves in altogether. Carol and Patrick's romantic bliss is short-lived, and they break up at the beginning of season six. However, this leads into another plot line where Carol finds out she is pregnant with Patrick's child. Carol choses to raise the baby, Scotty, on her own.

Estelle Getty reprised her Golden Girls character Sophia Petrillo during Empty Nests final two seasons (after the cancellation of The Golden Palace). In the show, it is explained that Sophia has moved back into the nearby Shady Pines retirement home.

Cast
 Richard Mulligan as Dr. Harry Weston
 Dinah Manoff as Carol Weston
 Kristy McNichol as Barbara Weston (1988–1992, 1995)
 David Leisure as Charley Dietz
 Park Overall as Laverne Todd
 Estelle Getty as Sophia Petrillo (1993–1995)
 Paul Provenza as Patrick Arcola (1992–1993)
 Lisa Rieffel as Emily Weston (1993)
 Marsha Warfield as Dr. Maxine Douglas (1993–1995)
 Bear the Dog as Dreyfuss the St. Bernard-Golden Retriever mix

Notable guest stars

 Don Adams
 Bea Arthur
 Diana Muldaur
 Loni Anderson
 Mayim Bialik
 Eddie Bracken
 Garth Brooks
 Patricia Crowley
 Angie Dickinson
 Stephen Dorff
 Morgan Fairchild
 Zsa Zsa Gabor
 Marla Gibbs
 Trevor Goddard
 Bobcat Goldthwait
 Lee Grant
 Harold Gould
 Pat Harrington
 Phil Hartman
 Earl Holliman
 Shirley Jones
 Gordon Jump
 Carol Kane
 Joey Lawrence
 Mark Linn-Baker
 Jane Lynch
 Wendie Malick
 Barbara Mandrell
 Rue McClanahan
 Edie McClurg
 Audrey Meadows
 Stephen Nichols
 Jerry Orbach
 Matthew Perry
 Donnelly Rhodes (also appeared on Soap as Dutch)
 Geraldo Rivera
 Doris Roberts
 Debra Jo Rupp
 Jennifer Salt (also appeared on Soap as Eunice)
 Peter Scolari
 Liz Sheridan
 Yeardley Smith
 Jeffrey Tambor
 Renée Taylor
 Danny Thomas
 Betty White
 Grace Zabriskie
 Adrian Zmed

 Episodes 

Production notes
In 1991, Empty Nest spawned its own spinoff, Nurses, a sitcom about a group of nurses working in the same hospital as Dr. Weston. The three series (Empty Nest, The Golden Girls and Nurses) represented one of the few times in American television history that three shows from the same producer, all taking place in the same city and explicitly set up with the characters knowing each other from the very beginning, aired on the same network in one night. On at least two occasions, Harris wrote storylines which carried through all three series as fictional crossovers.

Richard Mulligan and Dinah Manoff (who depict father Harry and daughter Carol in Empty Nest) had previously appeared as onscreen father-in-law and daughter-in-law characters in the show Soap, created by the same production team. Jay Johnson, who had appeared on Soap as Mulligan's son, also made a guest appearance.

Theme song
The show's theme song is "Life Goes On", written by John Bettis and George Tipton and performed by Billy Vera. For the first three seasons, the song is presented in a slower, more melancholy yet comical arrangement. The original opening titles sequence show Harry Weston taking Dreyfuss for a walk around town, with still images of the other regular cast members shown as they are credited.

When the third season began, a new opening sequence debuted, made up of footage from the series' episodes and showing each of the regular cast members.

For the final four seasons the theme song is presented in a higher, more upbeat arrangement with female backup singers, and the same title sequence introduced in the third season.

Crossovers
The following is a list of Empty Nest episodes featuring characters from The Golden Girls or Nurses.

 Season One 
Episode 4: "Fatal Attraction" – Blanche Devereaux from The Golden GirlsEpisode 10: "Libby's Gift" – Sophia Petrillo from The Golden GirlsEpisode 14: "Strange Bedfellows" – Rose Nylund from The Golden GirlsEpisode 17: "Dumped" – Dorothy Zbornak from The Golden Girls Season Two 
Episode 6: "Rambo of Neiman Marcus" – Rose Nylund from The Golden Girls Season Four 
Episode 8: "Windy" – Sophia Petrillo from The Golden Girls

Episode 20: "Dr. Weston and Mr. Hyde" – Rose Nylund from The Golden Girls Season Five 
Episode 20: "Love and Marriage" – Jack Trenton from Nurses Season Six 
Episode 2: "Bye-Bye, Baby... Hello: Part 1" – Casey MacAfee from NursesEpisode 7: "Mother Dearest" – Casey MacAfee from NursesSyndication
The series was unsuccessful when it was first syndicated, running in local syndication from September 1993 to September 2000, shortly before the death of star Richard Mulligan. During this time, Empty Nest aired on TBS from September 9 to December 6, 1996, and on WGN from September 9, 1996, to March 26, 1999, with both stations airing the series as part of the regular syndication run (both TBS and WGN were superstations).TV Guide – September 7-13, 1996. 

In the subsequent decade, the series did not air on American television. Hallmark Channel, which also licenses the rights to The Golden Girls, picked up the rights to the show in early 2011 and aired it from February 26 to June 26 of that year, but eventually removed it altogether.

Upon its launch on April 15, 2015, the new digital sub channel Laff began airing the series, and continued until March 30, 2018.

In Canada, the series was rerun on CBC Television during the 1990s.

In Italy, the series aired on Rai Uno (or Rai 1) under the name il Cane di Papà (Daddy's Dog) during the 1990s.

Awards
In 1989, Richard Mulligan won both an Emmy Award and a Golden Globe Award for Best Lead Actor in a Comedy Series. The series received a number of other Emmy and Golden Globe Award nominations over the years, especially for Mulligan and for Park Overall, who was nominated three times for a Golden Globe Award.

See also
 Dear John (1988)
 The Golden Girls''
 Spinoffs

References

External links
 
 

1980s American sitcoms
1988 American television series debuts
1990s American sitcoms
1995 American television series endings
American television spin-offs
English-language television shows
NBC original programming
Television series about families
Television series about sisters
Television series about widowhood
Television shows set in Miami
Television series by ABC Studios
The Golden Girls